The Sternberg Centre for Judaism, in East End Road, Finchley, London, is a campus hosting a number of  Jewish institutions, built around the 18th-century Finchley manor house.

It was founded to facilitate a number of Reform and Liberal Jewish institutions, attached to the Movement for Reform Judaism (formerly: Reform Synagogues of Great Britain), principally through education and cultural means. The centre was opened in 1981 by the Manor House Trust and is now named after Sigmund Sternberg. The founding organisations are: Leo Baeck College, the Movement for Reform Judaism and the Akiva School, the first Reform Jewish day school in England (also opened in 1981). Later the (Masorti) New North London Synagogue also located there. The Sternberg Centre also includes the offices of RSY Netzer, The Zionist Youth Movement for Reform Judaism.

The centre also hosted the Jewish Museum, Finchley until 2007.

Movement for Reform Judaism

The Movement for Reform Judaism has had its headquarters at the site since 1981. The Movement is the national umbrella organisation of 41 autonomous synagogues. Staff based at the Sternberg Centre work to support these synagogues including work with small communities, the Reform Beit Din (religious court), education, youth work, work with students and young adults and practical support for synagogues including HR, IT and communications.

Regular events are organised including a biennial Jewish music conference, residential weekends and events for people in mixed-faith relationships and those considering conversion to Judaism, a national biennial conference held at a regional venue and a northern Reform Jewish communities weekend.

Akiva School

Akiva School was established in 1981. It became a two-form entry voluntary aided school in 2007 and moved into a new purpose-built state-of-the-art building in January 2008. Akiva is the only voluntary-aided Progressive Jewish primary school in North West London. It is an inclusive and egalitarian learning community, teaching its children to be happy, confident and knowledgeable citizens, with a love of Israel and all aspects of Judaism. Akiva children are taught to understand and respect themselves, others and the world.

New North London Synagogue

The synagogue, which is affiliated to the Masorti movement, was founded by followers of Louis Jacobs, and located to the Sternberg Centre site after some years of nomadic existence. The congregation, which now has about 2,400 members, raised over £6 million to construct a new synagogue building on the site, which was opened in 2011.

Designed by van Heyningen and Haward Architects, the new synagogue includes  three prayer venues, a nursery and teenager’s room, as well as  social and administrative spaces. The synagogue's rabbi is Jonathan Wittenberg.

Leo Baeck College

Named in honour of Leo Baeck, the inspirational 20th-century German Reform rabbi, Leo Baeck College was founded in 1956 as a rabbinical school for training Liberal and Reform rabbis. Today, the college is a centre for the training of rabbis and teachers, and an educational consultancy. It also helps the development of community leaders and provides access to Jewish learning for all through interfaith work. It is a degree-awarding institution, specialising in Hebrew and other Jewish-related subjects. It is now based at the Sternberg Centre.

Manor House Centre for Psychotherapy and Counselling 

The Manor House Centre for Psychotherapy and Counselling (MHCPC) provides training for people working or planning to work in both paid and voluntary positions in the community. There are excellent teaching facilities, a library and cafeteria. The Training Programme has developed over many years experience enabling students to work effectively and creatively within the counselling field, in the community and in specific work places. The term "counselling" is used in many contexts and the variety of trainings and models can be confusing. The MHCPC offers comprehensive training in psychodynamic counselling leading to the Certificate in Counselling Skills or the Diploma in Psychodynamic Counselling and Therapy in the Community.

Jewish Museum, Finchley

Opened as the Museum of the Jewish East End, founded by David Jacobs in 1983, the museum's main intent was the preservation of the heritage of London's East End, an important and large community which has since largely dissipated. Renamed the London Museum of Jewish Life in 1990, and subsequently amalgamating with the Jewish Museum in Camden Town, the museum diversified to include the history of other Jewish communities in London, and is also active in Holocaust and anti-racism education.

The Finchley museum closed in 2007 and moved in 2009 to an enlarged building on the Camden site, which has released space for the expansion of the Akiva School.

See also
History of Church End Finchley – includes a history of the old Manor House at the centre of the site.

References

External links
The New North London Synagogue
European Judaism, Vol. 39,  No. 1, 2006. Special issue on the 50th anniversary of Leo Baeck College
50 years of Leo Baeck College: An overview 1956–2006
Leo Baeck College
New North London Synagogue on Jewish Communities and Records – UK (hosted by jewishgen.org).

1981 establishments in England
Buildings and structures in the London Borough of Barnet
Finchley
Jewish museums in the United Kingdom
Jewish seminaries
Masorti synagogues in the United Kingdom
Religion in the London Borough of Barnet
Religious museums in England
Synagogues in London